An automated clearing house (ACH) is a computer-based electronic network for processing transactions, usually domestic low value payments, between participating financial institutions. It is an electronic payment medium used in the United States and some selected regions for sending money between bank accounts directly. In contrast, the EMEA countries have Single Euro Payments Area (SEPA) as an alternative to ACH.  It may support both credit transfers and direct debits. The ACH system is designed to process batches of payments containing numerous transactions, and it charges fees low enough to encourage its use for low value payments.

History
The first automated clearing house was BACS in the United Kingdom, which started processing payments in April 1968.

In the U.S. in the late 1960s, a group of banks in California sought a replacement for check payments. This led to the first automated clearing house in the US in 1972, operated by the Federal Reserve Bank of San Francisco. 

BACS operated from the beginning on a net settlement basis. Netting ACH transactions reduces the amount of deposits a bank must hold.

Operation
ACHs process large volumes of credit and debit transactions in batches. ACH credit transfers are initiated by the payer and include payments such as: direct deposits, payrolls, retail payments and vendor payments. ACH direct debit collections are initiated by the payee with pre-authorization from the payer; ACH direct debits include consumer payments such as utility bills, insurance premiums, mortgage loans, and other types of bills. Transactions received by the bank during the day are stored and transmitted in batches to the ACH. ACHs are net settlement systems, so settlement may be delayed for days, and there is some settlement risk. ACHs may allow for the transfer of a limited amount of additional information along with payment instructions.

ACH payments contrast with real-time gross settlement (RTGS) payments which are processed immediately by the central RTGS system and not subject to any waiting period on a one-to-one basis. ACH systems are typically used for low-value, non-urgent transactions while RTGS systems are typically used for high-value, urgent transactions.

Operations
This section describes in a generic way the typical operation of an ACH system. Each ACH system has its own specifics; see, for example, quick facts for the Nacha ACH Network in the United States and its terminology. 
 The ordering customer makes a transaction initiation, which can be either manually or by sending a file of initiation requests to a bank.
 The bank gathers all transaction initiations for an ACH that arrive from different customers (combining manual and file-based).
 On a periodic basis, the bank creates a file that it dispatches to the ACH either at the end of day or in cycles throughout the day.
 The ACH operator combines the information submitted by the banks within each cycle (generally ACHs have several cycles throughout the day).
 The ACH operator informs each bank of the net settlement amount for which they are responsible for the cycle.
 The ACH operator ensures that the settlement amounts are received from all participants for the cycle, so that the cycle can be executed.
 The ACH operator informs the destinator's bank of the transaction details.
 When transaction arrives in the destination bank, the bank executes the transaction: such as crediting the payment to the beneficiary, while the ordering customer's bank debits the ordering customer's account.

Existing systems
There are various ACH systems around the world. The World Bank identified 87 systems in their 2010 Survey and 98 systems in their 2012 survey, while other sources have made qualitative analysis of a smaller number of ACH systems.

In addition, there are various ACH associations such as the European Automated Clearing House Association.

Uses of the ACH payment system
There are various usages of ACH systems; the terminology related to different types of transactions varying in different countries. Most ACH payment systems support the following types:
 Credit Transfer: non-immediate transfer of funds between accounts at different financial institutions for payments by retail customers and non-urgent business-to-business payments. 
 Direct debit payment of consumer bills such as mortgages, loans, utilities, insurance premiums, rents, and any other regular or membership style payment. These type of payments are usually used by businesses that collect ongoing payments from the same customer.

See also

 Clearing (finance)
 Clearing house (finance)
 Electronic funds transfer
 Pan-European automated clearing house
 Payment system
 Society for Worldwide Interbank Financial Telecommunication
 Wire transfer

References

Payment networks

Electronic funds transfer
Banking terms
Payment clearing systems